Granitas Klaipėda can refer to:
FK Atlantas, a Lithuanian football club which was known as Granitas Klaipėda in the past.
FK Klaipėdos Granitas, a Lithuanian football club founded in 2012.